Umarke is a small village in Sambrial Tehsil (formerly Daska Tehsil), Sialkot District, Pakistan. It has a population of around 500.  

Villages in Sialkot District